The 2023 NCAA Division I women's basketball tournament is currently a single-elimination tournament of 68 teams to determine the National Collegiate Athletic Association (NCAA) Division I college basketball national champion for the 2022–23 NCAA Division I women's basketball season. The 41st edition of the tournament began in March 2023, and will conclude with the championship game on April 2 at the American Airlines Center in Dallas.

Big Sky champion Sacramento State, Atlantic 10 champion Saint Louis, Southland champion Southeastern Louisiana and WAC champion Southern Utah will make their NCAA debuts, while CAA champions  will make its first NCAA appearance since 1983.

Tournament procedure

A total of 68 teams will participate in the 2023 tournament, consisting of the 32 conference champions, and 36 "at-large" bids to be extended by the NCAA Selection Committee. The last four at-large teams and teams seeded 65 through 68 overall will compete in First Four games, whose winners will advance to the 64-team first round.

2023 NCAA tournament schedule and venues  

The first two rounds, also referred to as the subregionals, will be played at the sites of the top 16 seeds, as was done from 2016 to 2019.

A dramatic change from past tournaments is that the regional rounds (Sweet Sixteen and Elite Eight) will be held at two sites, instead of the four used in past tournaments.  Two regionals will be held in Greenville, South Carolina and the other two will be held in Seattle.  Specific regional names will be announced by the NCAA committee on or before selections are announced on March 12, 2023.

First Four 
 March 15—16
 Four of the campuses seeded in the Top 16

Subregionals (first and second rounds)
March 17 and 19 (Fri/Sun)
 Colonial Life Arena, Columbia, South Carolina (Host: University of South Carolina)
 Edmund P. Joyce Center, Notre Dame, Indiana (Host: University of Notre Dame)
 XFINITY Center, College Park, Maryland (Host: University of Maryland)
 Pete Maravich Assembly Center, Baton Rouge, Louisiana (Host: Louisiana State University)
 Jon M. Huntsman Center, Salt Lake City, Utah (Host: University of Utah)
 Cassell Coliseum, Blacksburg, Virginia (Host: Virginia Tech)
 Maples Pavilion, Stanford, California (Host: Stanford University)
 Carver–Hawkeye Arena, Iowa City, Iowa (Host: University of Iowa)
March 18 and 20 (Sat/Mon)
 Pauley Pavilion, Los Angeles, California (Host: University of California, Los Angeles)
 Simon Skjodt Assembly Hall, Bloomington, Indiana (Host: Indiana University)
 Finneran Pavilion, Villanova, Pennsylvania (Host: Villanova University)
 Thompson–Boling Arena, Knoxville, Tennessee (Host: University of Tennessee)
 Value City Arena, Columbus, Ohio (Host: Ohio State University)
 Harry A. Gampel Pavilion, Storrs, Connecticut (Host: University of Connecticut)
 Moody Center, Austin, Texas (Host: University of Texas at Austin)
 Cameron Indoor Stadium, Durham, North Carolina (Host: Duke University)

Regional semifinals and finals (Sweet Sixteen and Elite Eight)
March 24—27
Greenville regional
Bon Secours Wellness Arena, Greenville, South Carolina (Hosts: Furman University and the Southern Conference)
Seattle regional 
 Climate Pledge Arena, Seattle, Washington (Hosts: Seattle University and the Western Athletic Conference) 

National semifinals and championship (Final Four and championship)
 March 31 and April 2
American Airlines Center, Dallas, Texas (Hosts: Southern Methodist University and the Big 12 Conference/Conference USA)

This is the second time the women's Final Four will be played in Dallas (2017).

Qualification and selection

Automatic qualifiers
The following teams automatically qualified for the 2023 NCAA field by virtue of winning their conference's tournament.

Bids by state

Tournament seeds (list by region)

The tournament seeds and regions were determined through the NCAA basketball tournament selection process and were published by the selection committee after the brackets were released.

*See First Four

Tournament bracket
All times are listed in Eastern Daylight Time (UTC−4)
* denotes overtime period</onlyinclude>

First Four
The First Four games involve eight teams: the four overall lowest-ranked teams and the four lowest-ranked at-large teams.

Greenville Regional 1 – Bon Secours Wellness Arena, Greenville, SC

Greenville Regional 1 final

Greenville Regional 1 all-tournament team

Greenville Regional 2 – Bon Secours Wellness Arena, Greenville, SC

Greenville Regional 2 final

Greenville Regional 2 all-tournament team

Seattle Regional 3 – Climate Pledge Arena – Seattle, WA

Seattle Regional 3 final

Seattle Regional 3 all-tournament team

Seattle Regional 4 – Climate Pledge Arena – Seattle, WA

Seattle Regional 4 final

Seattle Regional 4 all-tournament team

Final Four - American Airlines Center – Dallas, TX

National semifinals

National Championship

Final Four all-tournament team

Game summaries and tournament notes

Upsets
Per the NCAA, "Upsets are defined as when the winner of the game was seeded two or more places lower than the team it defeated." The 2023 tournament has  six upsets so far, with five in the first round, and one in the second round.

Record by conference

The FF, R64, R32, S16, E8, F4, CG, and NC columns indicate how many teams from each conference were in the first four, round of 64 (first round), round of 32 (second round), Sweet 16, Elite Eight, Final Four, championship game, and national champion, respectively.

Media coverage

Television
ESPN will serve as exclusive broadcaster of the tournament; it will be the second-last year of its current contract to air NCAA tournaments, which lasts through the 2023–24 season. On August 23, 2022, ESPN announced that the national championship game would be broadcast by ABC for the first time, with an afternoon scheduling.

Television channels
Selection Show – ESPN
First Four – ESPN2 and ESPNU
First Round –  ESPN, ESPN2, ESPNU, ESPNews, and ABC
Second Round – ESPN, ESPN2, ESPNU and ABC
Regional semifinals – ESPN , ESPN2, and ABC
National quarter (Elite Eight) and semifinals (Final Four) – ESPN
National championship – ABC

Studio host and analysts
 Elle Duncan (Host) (First Four, First, Second rounds, Regionals, Final Four, and National championship game)
 Kelsey Riggs (Host) (First Four, First, and Second rounds)
 Rebecca Lobo (Analyst) (First Four, First, Second rounds, Final Four, and National championship game)
 Andraya Carter (Analyst) (First Four, First, and Second rounds)
 Nikki Fargas (Analyst) (First Four, First, Second rounds, Regionals, Final Four, and National championship game)
 Monica McNutt (Analyst) (First Four, First, Second rounds, and Regionals)
 Carolyn Peck (Analyst) (Final Four and National championship game)

Commentary teams

First Four
 Jenn Hildreth & Mike Thibault – Notre Dame, Indiana
 Brenda VanLengen & Holly Warlick – Bloomington, Indiana
 Sam Gore & Kim Adams – Columbus, Ohio
 Roy Philpott & Brooke Weisbrod – Stanford, California

First & second rounds Friday/Sunday (Subregionals)
 Courtney Lyle & Carolyn Peck – Columbia, South Carolina
 Jenn Hildreth & Mike Thibault – Notre Dame, Indiana
 Tiffany Greene & Jimmy Dykes – College Park, Maryland
 Kevin Fitzgerald & Andrea Lloyd-Curry – Baton Rouge, Louisiana
 Elise Woodward & Dan Hughes – Salt Lake City, Utah
 Angel Gray & Helen Williams – Blacksburg, Virginia
 Roy Philpott & Brooke Weisbrod – Stanford, California
 Dave O'Brien & Christy Winters-Scott – Iowa City, Iowa
First & second rounds Saturday/Monday (Subregionals)
 Ann Schatz & Meghan McKeown – Los Angeles, California
 Brenda VanLengen & Holly Warlick – Bloomington, Indiana
 John Brickley & Aja Ellison – Villanova, Pennsylvania
 Pam Ward & Stephanie White – Knoxville, Tennessee
 Sam Gore & Kim Adams – Columbus, Ohio
 Beth Mowins & Christy Thomaskutty – Storrs, Connecticut
 Eric Frede & Tamika Catchings – Austin, Texas
 Sam Ravech & Kelly Gramlich – Durham, North Carolina

Regionals (Sweet 16 and Elite Eight)
 Ryan Ruocco, Rebecca Lobo, Holly Rowe & Andraya Carter
 Beth Mowins, Debbie Antonelli & Angel Gray 
 Courtney Lyle, Carolyn Peck & Brooke Weisbrod
 Pam Ward, Stephanie White, Holly Rowe & Andraya Carter
Final Four and National Championship
 Ryan Ruocco, Rebecca Lobo, Holly Rowe & Andraya Carter – Dallas, Texas

Radio
Westwood One will serve as radio broadcaster of the tournament.

Regionals (Sweet 16 and Elite Eight)
 TBA – Greenville, South Carolina 1
 TBA – Greenville, South Carolina 2
 TBA & Kristen Kozlowski – Seattle, Washington 3
 Matt Chazanow & Krista Blunk – Seattle, Washington 4

Final Four and National Championship
 Ryan Radtke, Debbie Antonelli & Krista Blunk – Dallas, Texas

See also 
2023 Women's National Invitation Tournament
2023 Women's Basketball Invitational
2023 NCAA Division II women's basketball tournament
2023 NCAA Division III women's basketball tournament
2023 NCAA Division I men's basketball tournament

References

External links 
 NCAA Women's Basketball Division I

NCAA Division I women's basketball tournament
NCAA Division I women's basketball tournament
NCAA Division I women's basketball tournament
NCAA Division I women's basketball tournament
NCAA Division I women's basketball tournament
2022–23 NCAA Division I women's basketball season
NCAA